Qiao Renliang (October 15, 1987 – September 16, 2016), also known as Kimi Qiao, was a Chinese singer and actor. He took part in the second season of My Hero (加油好男儿) and finished the competition as the runner-up for that season in 2007, and released his first EP in 2008. On September 16, 2016, Qiao was found dead in his Shanghai apartment, after investigation, the police and his company confirmed that the case was a suicide because of depression. He was 28 years old that year.

Life
Qiao Renliang was born as the only son to a modest family in Shanghai on October 15, 1987.  He graduated from Shanghai Dianji University (上海电机学院). Before the commencement of his singing career, Qiao was a track and field athlete who specialised in high jump events. He was a classmate of 110-meter hurdler Liu Xiang in primary school. Qiao won the National High Jump Competition in 2003.

Qiao's English nickname, Kimi, originates from his admiration of Finnish Formula 1 driver Kimi Räikkönen.

In 2005, Qiao participated in the "Golden Star" competition (金鹰之星) and became the winner of the "New Voice" segment. He also took part in the second season of My Hero and finished as runner-up in the 2007 competition.

In 2008, he released his first EP Start today (今天开始) which ranked top ten on the China Album Sales Chart. He was also chosen to sing the theme song of Windows 7 in the Asia-Pacific Region. Qiao also starred in numerous movies and television series.

Death
On September 16, 2016, Qiao was found dead in his apartment on Qishun Road, Putuo District, Shanghai. After an investigation, the police confirmed that the cause of death was suicide because of depression. He was 28 years old.

Posthumous album
On December 10, 2016, Warner Music China, Qiao's music label, released a posthumous album titled "KIMI". December 10 was deliberately chosen as the album's release date, due to two of Qiao's previous albums also being released on the same day in 2009 and 2012.

Filmography

Film

Television

Variety show

Discography
Start Today (今天开始, 2008)
The Lovely You (可爱的你, 2009)
Diamond (钻石, December 10, 2009)
Pin.K (Pin.K/拼, December 10, 2012)
Excellent (耀·出色, 2014)
KIMI (December 10, 2016), released posthumously

References

External links 
 

1987 births
2016 deaths
Male actors from Shanghai
Singers from Shanghai
Chinese male film actors
Chinese male television actors
21st-century Chinese male actors
21st-century Chinese male singers
2016 suicides
Suicides by asphyxiation
Suicides in the People's Republic of China